The Eemian (also called the last interglacial, Sangamonian Stage, Ipswichian, Mikulin, Kaydaky, penultimate, Valdivia or Riss-Würm) was the interglacial period which began about 130,000 years ago at the end of the Penultimate Glacial Period and ended about 115,000 years ago at the beginning of the Last Glacial Period. It corresponds to Marine Isotope Stage 5e. Although sometimes referred to as the "last interglacial" (in the "most recent previous" sense of "last"), it was the second-to-latest interglacial period of the current Ice Age, the most recent being the Holocene which extends to the present day (having followed the last glacial period). The prevailing Eemian climate was, on average, around 1 to 2 degrees Celsius (1.8 to 3.6 Fahrenheit) warmer than that of the Holocene.

The Eemian is known as the Ipswichian in the UK, the Mikulin interglacial in Russia, the Valdivia interglacial in Chile and the Riss-Würm interglacial in the Alps. Depending on how a specific publication defines the Sangamonian Stage of North America, the Eemian is equivalent to either all or part of it.

The period falls into the Middle Paleolithic and is of some interest for the evolution of anatomically modern humans, who were present in Western Asia (Skhul and Qafzeh hominins) as well as in Southern Africa by this time, representing the earliest split of modern human populations that persists to the present time (associated with mitochondrial haplogroup L0).

Climate

Global temperatures

The Eemian climate is believed to have been warmer than the current Holocene. Changes in the Earth's orbital parameters from today (greater obliquity and eccentricity, and perihelion), known as Milankovitch cycles, probably led to greater seasonal temperature variations in the Northern Hemisphere. During summer months, temperatures in the Arctic region were about 2-4 °C higher than today. Hardwood trees such as hazel and oak grew as far north as Oulu, Finland.

At the peak of the Eemian, the Northern Hemisphere winters were generally warmer and wetter than now, though some areas were actually slightly cooler than today. The hippopotamus was distributed as far north as the rivers Rhine and Thames. Trees grew as far north as southern Baffin Island in the Canadian Arctic Archipelago: currently, the northern limit is further south at Kuujjuaq in northern Quebec. Coastal Alaska was warm enough during the summer due to reduced sea ice in the Arctic Ocean to allow Saint Lawrence Island (now tundra) to have boreal forest, although inadequate precipitation caused a reduction in the forest cover in interior Alaska and Yukon Territory despite warmer conditions. The prairie-forest boundary in the Great Plains of the United States lay further west near Lubbock, Texas, whereas the current boundary is near Dallas.  The period closed as temperatures steadily fell to conditions cooler and drier than the present, with a 468-year-long aridity pulse in central Europe at about 116,000 BC, and by 112,000 BC, a glacial period had returned.

Kaspar et al. (GRL, 2005) performed a comparison of a coupled general circulation model (GCM) with reconstructed Eemian temperatures for Europe. Central Europe (north of the Alps) was found to be  warmer than present; south of the Alps, conditions were 1–2 °C cooler than today. The model (generated using observed greenhouse gas concentrations and Eemian orbital parameters) generally reproduces these observations, leading them to conclude that these factors are enough to explain the Eemian temperatures.

A 2018 study based on soil samples from Sokli in northern Finland identified abrupt cold spells ca. 120,000 years ago caused by shifts in the North Atlantic Current, lasting hundreds of years and causing temperature drops of a few degrees and vegetation changes in these regions.

Sea level 

Recent research on marine sediment cores offshore of the West Antarctic Ice Sheet suggest that the sheet melted during the Eemian, and that ocean waters rose as fast as 2.5 meters per century. Global mean sea surface temperatures are thought to have been higher than in the Holocene, but not by enough to explain the rise in sea level through thermal expansion alone, and so melting of polar ice caps must also have occurred. Because of the sea level drop since the Eemian, exposed fossil coral reefs are common in the tropics, especially in the Caribbean and along the Red Sea coastlines. These reefs often contain internal erosion surfaces showing significant sea level instability during the Eemian.

A 2007 study found evidence that the Greenland ice core site Dye 3 was glaciated during the Eemian, which implies that Greenland could have contributed at most  to sea level rise. Scandinavia was an island. Vast areas of northwestern Europe and the West Siberian Plain were inundated.

Definition of the Eemian
 The Eemian Stage was first recognized from boreholes in the area of the city of Amersfoort, Netherlands, by Pieter Harting (1875). He named the beds "Système Eémien", after the river Eem on which Amersfoort is located. Harting noticed the marine molluscan assemblages to be very different from the modern fauna of the North Sea. Many species from the Eemian layers nowadays show a much more southern distribution, ranging from South of the Strait of Dover to Portugal (Lusitanian faunal province) and even into the Mediterranean (Mediterranean faunal province). More information on the molluscan assemblages is given by Lorié (1887), and Spaink (1958). Since their discovery, Eemian beds in the Netherlands have mainly been recognized by their marine molluscan content combined with their stratigraphical position and other palaeontology. The marine beds there are often underlain by tills that are considered to date from the Saalian, and overlain by local fresh water or wind-blown deposits from the Weichselian. In contrast to e.g. the deposits in Denmark, the Eemian deposits in the type area have never been found overlain by tills, nor in ice-pushed positions.
Van Voorthuysen (1958) described the foraminifera from the type site, whereas Zagwijn (1961) published the palynology, providing a subdivision of this stage into pollen stages. At the end of the 20th century, the type site was re-investigated using old and new data in a multi-disciplinary approach (Cleveringa et al., 2000). At the same time a parastratotype was selected in the Amsterdam glacial basin in the Amsterdam-Terminal borehole and was the subject of a multidisciplinary investigation (Van Leeuwen, et al., 2000). These authors also published a U/Th age for late Eemian deposits from this borehole of 118,200 ± 6,300 years ago. A historical review of Dutch Eemian research is provided by Bosch, Cleveringa and Meijer, 2000.

See also
Marine Isotope Stage 5
Paleoclimatology
Timeline of glaciation

References

Further reading 

 Cleveringa, P., Meijer, T., van Leeuwen, R.J.W., de Wolf, H., Pouwer, R., Lissenberg T. and Burger, A.W., 2000. The Eemian stratotype locality at Amersfoort in the central Netherlands: a re-evaluation of old and new data. Geologie & Mijnbouw / Netherlands Journal of Geosciences, 79(2/3): 197–216.
 Harting, P., 1875. Le système Éemien Archives Néerlandaises Sciences Exactes et Naturelles de la Société Hollandaise des Sciences (Harlem), 10: 443–454.
 Harting, P., 1886. Het Eemdal en het Eemstelsel Album der Natuur, 1886: 95–100.

 Lorié, J., 1887. Contributions a la géologie des Pays Bas III. Le Diluvium plus récent ou sableux et le système Eémien Archives Teyler, Ser. II, Vol. III: 104–160.

 Spaink, G., 1958. De Nederlandse Eemlagen, I: Algemeen overzicht. Wetenschappelijke Mededelingen Koninklijke Nederlandse Natuurhistorische Vereniging 29, 44 pp.
 Van Leeuwen, R.J., Beets, D., Bosch, J.H.A., Burger, A.W., Cleveringa, P., van Harten, D., Herngreen, G.F.W., Langereis, C.G., Meijer, T., Pouwer, R., de Wolf, H., 2000. Stratigraphy and integrated facies analysis of the Saalian and Eemian sediments in the Amsterdam-Terminal borehole, the Netherlands. Geologie en Mijnbouw / Netherlands Journal of Geosciences 79, 161–196.
 Van Voorthuysen, J.H., 1958. Foraminiferen aus dem Eemien (Riss-Würm-Interglazial) in der Bohrung Amersfoort I (Locus Typicus).  Mededelingen Geologische Stichting NS 11(1957), 27–39.
 Zagwijn, W.H., 1961. Vegetation, climate and radiocarbon datings in the Late Pleistocene of the Netherlands. Part 1: Eemian and Early Weichselian. Mededelingen Geologische Stichting NS 14, 15–45.

External links
 www.foraminifera.eu Foraminifera (Microfossils) of the Eemian Interglacial 

Interglacials
Paleoclimatology
Pleistocene